Christian Petzold may refer to:
 Christian Petzold (composer) (1677–1733), German composer and organist
 Christian Petzold (director) (born 1960), German film director